RPU may refer to:

 RAID processing unit, chip used for RAID calculations
 Radio Processing Unit (Baseband processor), for digital radio connectivity
 Ray Processing Unit, component of ray-tracing hardware
 Refrigerant Pumping Unit
 Remote pickup unit, a radio link used to send program content such as news reporting to a broadcast center
 Reprocessed uranium
 Revenue per unit
 Refrigerant Pumping Unit
 Right of perpetual usufruct, public ground lease in Poland
 Rigid Polyurethane, a type of plastic
 Roads Policing Unit,  the motorway and trunk-road police unit of a British police force

fr:RPU